The 2022 Vuelta a Burgos Feminas was a road cycling stage race that took place in the province of Burgos in northern Spain between 19 and 22 May 2022. It was the seventh edition of the Vuelta a Burgos Feminas.

Route

References

External links 
 

Vuelta a Burgos Feminas
Vuelta a Burgos Feminas
Vuelta a Burgos Feminas